Elections were held in the state of Western Australia on 23 March 1968 to elect all 51 members to the Legislative Assembly and 15 members to the 30-seat Legislative Council. The Liberal-Country coalition government, led by Premier Sir David Brand, won a record fourth term in office against the Labor Party, led by Opposition Leader John Tonkin.

Results

Legislative Assembly

|}

 449,122 electors were enrolled to vote at the election, but 14 seats (27.45% of the total) were uncontested—five Liberal seats representing 32,810 enrolled voters, five Country seats representing 29,746 enrolled voters, and four Labor seats representing 26,776 enrolled voters.

Legislative Council

|}

 449,122 electors were enrolled to vote at the election, but 9 seats (60% of the total) were uncontested—three Liberal seats representing 99,137 enrolled voters, three Country seats representing 53,847 enrolled voters, and three Labor seats representing 86,198 enrolled voters.

Post-election pendulum

See also
 Members of the Western Australian Legislative Assembly, 1965–1968
 Members of the Western Australian Legislative Assembly, 1968–1971
 Candidates of the 1968 Western Australian state election

References

Elections in Western Australia
1968 elections in Australia
1960s in Western Australia
March 1968 events in Australia